Blake Shelton is the debut studio album by American country music artist Blake Shelton. It was released in July 2001 via Warner Bros. Records Nashville. The album features three singles: "Austin", "All Over Me", and "Ol' Red". It has been certified platinum by the Recording Industry Association of America (RIAA). Shelton co-wrote four of the ten tracks.

Singles
"Austin" was the lead-off single from the album, reaching number one on the Billboard Hot Country Singles & Tracks (now Hot Country Songs) charts that year. Although Shelton has since charted five more number ones, "Austin" is his longest-lasting number one hit, at five weeks. Following this song was "All Over Me", which reached number 18 on the country charts, and "Ol' Red", which peaked at number 14. The latter was originally recorded by George Jones on his 1990 album You Oughta Be Here with Me, and by Kenny Rogers on his 1993 album If Only My Heart Had a Voice. Due to the closure of Giant Records in 2001, Shelton was transferred to the Nashville division of Giant's parent label, Warner Bros. Records, which promoted and distributed the second and third singles.

Critical reception
Maria Konicki Dinoia of Allmusic rated the album four stars out of five, saying, "This impressive ten-song compilation is an earnest debut full of lots of promise and originality" and citing the presence of Bobby Braddock cowrites.

Track listing

Personnel
Compiled from liner notes.

Musicians
Bobby Braddock – synthesizer strings
Alison Brown – 5-string banjo
Chad Cromwell – drums
Dan Dugmore – pedal steel guitar, lap steel guitar, dobro
Shannon Forrest – drums, percussion
Steve Gibson – sitar
Rob Hajacos – fiddle
Tim Lauer – accordion, keyboards, organ, piano, synthesizer
Terry McMillan – harmonica, Jew's harp
Alison Prestwood – bass guitar
Mike Rojas – piano
Brent Rowan – electric guitar, sitar
Scotty Sanders – lap steel guitar
Blake Shelton - lead vocals
John Willis – acoustic guitar
Jonathan Yudkin – fiddle, mandolin
Andrea Zonn – fiddle

Background vocals
Deborah Allen – "Problems at Home"
 Greg Barnhill – "Every Time I Look at You", "If I Was Your Man"
 Richard Mainegra – "I Thought There Was Time", "That's What I Call Home"
 Rachel Proctor – "Ol' Red"
 Dennis Wilson – "All Over Me", "She Doesn't Know She's Got It", "Austin", "Ol' Red", "I Thought There Was Time", "Same Old Song"
 Curtis Young – "Every Time I Look at You", "Problems at Home", "If I Was Your Man"

String section
David Greer, David Davidson, David Angell, Conni Ellisor, Pam Sixfin, Mary Katherin VanOsdale – violin
Kris Wilkinson, Jim Grosjean, Monisa Angell – viola
John Catchings, Anthony LaMarchina – cello

Strings arranged by Bobby Braddock and Tim Lauer, conducted by Tim Lauer.

Technical
Janice Azrak – art director
Bobby Braddock – producer
Señor McGuire – photography
Denny Purcell – mastering
Ed Seay – mixing
Jim Shea – photography

Chart performance

Weekly charts

Year-end charts

Singles

Certifications

References

2001 debut albums
Blake Shelton albums
Warner Records albums